Margaret Verble is a Native American author and member of the Cherokee Nation of Oklahoma. Her book Maud's Line was a finalist for the 2016 Pulitzer Prize for Fiction.

Early life and education
Verble was born in Muskogee County, Oklahoma, but grew up in Nashville, Tennessee. She earned her Bachelor of Arts degree, Master's degree, and Ed.D. from the University of Kentucky.

Career
After earning her degrees, Verble moved to Lexington, Kentucky, to run a business. In 2015, her first novel Maud's Line was named a finalist for the 2016 Pulitzer Prize for Fiction. Maud's Line focuses on her Cherokee nation heritage during the 1920s through the lens of a fictional woman named Maud Nail. She later published a prequel to her first novel titled Cherokee America, set in 1875.

References

Living people
People from Muskogee County, Oklahoma
Writers from Muskogee, Oklahoma
University of Kentucky alumni
Cherokee writers
Year of birth missing (living people)
21st-century American novelists
21st-century American women writers
21st-century Native Americans
21st-century Native American women